Footscrew Nunatak is a nunatak  high to the southwest of Windy Gully, standing  southeast of Altar Mountain in the Quartermain Mountains of Victoria Land, Antarctica. It is one of a group of names in the area associated with surveying applied in 1993 by the New Zealand Geographic Board, a footscrew being a leveling screw of a tripod as used with surveying instruments.

References 

Nunataks of Victoria Land
Scott Coast